Andrew Lindsay (born 25 October 1979) is a British paralympic swimmer who has represented Great Britain at four Paralympic Games from 1996 to 2008 winning three medals. He competes in the S7 category.

At the 1996 Paralympic Games in Atlanta Lindsay competed in men's 50, 100 and 400 m freestyle and 100 m backstroke, winning the silver medal in the latter. He repeated the events at the 2000 Games in Sydney, this time winning gold in the 100 m backstroke. In 2004 in Athens he once again took gold in the 100 m backstroke.

He is the current world record holder for the S7 category over 200 m backstroke.

Lindsay was inducted into the Scottish Swimming Hall of Fame in 2018.

References

External links
 
 

1979 births
Living people
Scottish male swimmers
Paralympic swimmers of Great Britain
Paralympic gold medalists for Great Britain
Paralympic silver medalists for Great Britain
Swimmers at the 1996 Summer Paralympics
Swimmers at the 2000 Summer Paralympics
Swimmers at the 2004 Summer Paralympics
Medalists at the 1996 Summer Paralympics
Medalists at the 2000 Summer Paralympics
Medalists at the 2004 Summer Paralympics
World record holders in paralympic swimming
Paralympic medalists in swimming
British male backstroke swimmers
S7-classified Paralympic swimmers